Marc van Heerden (born 16 March 1988) is a South African soccer player who plays as a left-back for Cape Town City F.C in the Premier Soccer League. He is equally adept at playing centre back and defensive midfielder.

Career overview
Van Heerden left AmaZulu F.C. for Chippa United F.C. in 2016, following AmaZulu F.C.'s unsuccessful campaign to gain promotion from the National First Division to the Premier Soccer League. In 2017 Van Heerden made the switch to Orlando Pirates from Chippa United F.C.
Van Heerden returned to AmaZulu in 2018, this after both he and Orlando Pirates agreed to mutually terminate his contract.

International career
Van Heerden made his international debut for South Africa in a 2-0 victory against Burkina Faso on 17 August 2013.

References

External links
 
 

1988 births
Living people
Soccer players from Johannesburg
Afrikaner people
South African people of Dutch descent
South African soccer players
Association football defenders
Orlando Pirates F.C. players
University of Pretoria F.C. players
AmaZulu F.C. players
Chippa United F.C. players
Stellenbosch F.C. players
Cape Town City F.C. (2016) players
South African Premier Division players
South Africa international soccer players